Switzerland was the host nation for the 1928 Winter Olympics in St. Moritz. The lone bronze medal won in men's ice hockey remains the lowest output by a host nation at a modern Olympic games (Winter or Summer).

Medalists

Bobsleigh

Cross-country skiing

Men

Figure skating

Women

Pairs

Ice hockey

Group C
The top team (highlighted) advanced to the medal round.

Medal round
The top teams from each of the three groups, plus Canada, which had received a bye into the medal round, played a 3-game round-robin to determine the medal winners.

Nordic combined 

Events:
 18 km cross-country skiing
 normal hill ski jumping

The cross-country skiing part of this event was combined with the main medal event of cross-country skiing. Those results can be found above in this article in the cross-country skiing section. Some athletes (but not all) entered in both the cross-country skiing and Nordic combined event, their time on the 18 km was used for both events. One would expect that athletes competing at the Nordic combined event, would participate in the cross-country skiing event as well, as they would have the opportunity to win more than one medal. This was not always the case due to the maximum number of athletes that could represent a country per event.

The ski jumping (normal hill) event was held separate from the main medal event of ski jumping, results can be found in the table below.

Skeleton

Ski jumping

References

 Olympic Winter Games 1928, full results by sports-reference.com

Nations at the 1928 Winter Olympics
1928
Olympics, Winter